Patrick Mann Estes (January 27, 1872 – February 16, 1947) was an American college football player, attorney, and founder, part owner, and general counsel of the Life and Casualty Company of Nashville.

Early years
He attended Washington University in St. Louis, and he was the first quarterback for the Vanderbilt Commodores football team.

Attorney at law
Estes was then a law partner of Thomas James Tyne.

References

External links
 

1872 births
1947 deaths
19th-century players of American football
American football quarterbacks
Vanderbilt Commodores football players
People from Brownsville, Tennessee
People from Nashville, Tennessee
Washington University Bears football players
Washington University in St. Louis alumni
Vanderbilt University alumni